Malham Beck is a stream some  long, running southwards through the valley beneath Malham Cove in the Yorkshire Dales, England. It originates in a cave beneath Malham Cove, and flows through Malham before joining Gordale Beck to become the River Aire just south of the village.

References

Rivers of North Yorkshire